The global commercial production for human use of fish and other aquatic organisms occurs in two ways: they are either captured wild by commercial fishing or they are cultivated and harvested using aquacultural and farming techniques.

According to the Food and Agriculture Organization (FAO), the world production in 2005 consisted of 93.2 million tonnes captured by commercial fishing in wild fisheries, plus 48.1 million tonnes produced by fish farms. In addition, 1.3 million tons of aquatic plants (seaweed etc.) were captured in wild fisheries and 14.8 million tons were produced by aquaculture. The number of individual fish caught in the wild has been estimated at 0.97-2.7 trillion per year (not counting fish farms or marine invertebrates).

Marine and inland fisheries

Capture production by species
The following table shows the capture production by groups of species (fish, crustaceans, molluscs, etc.) in tonnes.

Projected production
The following table shows the fish production in 2004 and projections for 2010 and later simulation target years. All figures, other than percentages, are in million tonnes.

Charts

See also
 Fishing industry by country
 Wild fisheries
 Ocean fisheries
 Population dynamics of fisheries
 List of harvested aquatic animals by weight

Notes

References
 FAO (2005) Review of the state of world marine fishery resources. Fisheries technical paper T457, 
 FAO (2006) Yearbooks of Fishery Statistics Summary Tables
 FAO (2007) State of the World Fisheries and Aquaculture 2006 Fisheries and Aquaculture Department, Rome. 
 FAO (2009) State of the World Fisheries and Aquaculture 2008 Fisheries and Aquaculture Department, Rome.  
 FAO (2010) State of the World Fisheries and Aquaculture 2010 Fisheries and Aquaculture Department, Rome.  
 FAO Yearbook (2008) Fishery and Aquaculture Statistics 2006 Rome.  
 FAO: Summary tables of Fishery Statistics Rome. Retirved 28 November 2009.
 FAO: Fishery resources Rome.

Fishing industry